"Molitva" ("Prayer") is a song with music by Vladimir Graić, lyrics by Saša Milošević Mare, and sung by Serbian singer Marija Šerifović. The song marked the country's Eurovision debut as an independent nation, the  having dissolved in June 2006. The song was released as a CD single in nine different versions on 27 July 2007 by Connective Records.

"Molitva" also won the semi-final in the 2007 competition, collecting 298 points, which was the highest number of points ever gained in the semi final under the single semi final format of the contest (2004–2007).

It was succeeded as the Serbian Representative by "Oro" by Jelena Tomašević and as the winning song by "Believe" by Dima Bilan from Russia.

Background

Molitva was the last entirely non-English song to win the contest until the 2017 edition, where 's Salvador Sobral won with "Amar pelos dois", as well as being the first time a ballad had won since televoting became the standard and the first one of the so-called "Balkan ballads" that came to prominence since the late 1990s to win the contest. The song is also notable for its stage presentation because it lacked dance routines, revealing or showy costumes, pyrotechnics and other gimmicks. The Eurovision Song Contest is often accused of concentrating on these things instead of the music itself. Many elements of "Molitva" contrasted with the previous winner, "Hard Rock Hallelujah".

Šerifović's performance was complemented by the notable presence of the five backing singers, who joined together afterwards to form Beauty Queens. They later joined her with a Serbian flag at the end.

Other versions
The English version is titled "Destiny", the Russian version is titled "" (Molitva), and the Finnish version is called ""; these were performed by the Beauty Queens, without Šerifović. The song has also been released as a dance remix and a remix named "Jovan Radomir mix" by Swedish TV-presenter Jovan Radomir, who also wrote the English lyrics.  An instrumental version has also been released as well as a karaoke version.  The UK oompah band Oompah Brass recorded an instrumental version of "Molitva" on their album Oompocalypse Now (2008), premiered at the 2007 Belgrade Beer Festival.

Use of the song
Molitva has been often played for many successes Serbia has had in the year 2007. It was played at a welcome party for Serbia's tennis players after their French Open successes.

During Wimbledon 2007, Molitva was often used during clips displaying the courts and players on the BBC. It was mainly used before and after footage or interviews with the Serbian players.

At the final of the Eurovision Song Contest 2008, which took place on 24 May, Šerifović sang "Molitva" as the opening.

The short 10-second instrumental theme of the song can be heard even today on Radio Television of Serbia (RTS) (between scheduled broadcasts as short intermezzo or when presenting RTS programme/image).

In 2012, Šerifović performed this song during the interval act of the second semi-final at the Eurovision Song Contest 2012 in Baku. She was accompanied by traditional Azeri musical instruments.

In 2015, the chorus of the song was played on Day 102 of the soap opera parody Kalyeserye of the Philippine noontime variety show Eat Bulaga!.

Molitva was included in the list of the 10 best Eurovision winners according to the SBS in 2016 and to The Independent in 2019, while The Eurovision Times, a fan blog, ranked it as the third best Eurovision song of all time.

Track listing
"Molitva" (Serbian version) – 3:03
"Destiny" (English version) – 3:04
"Molitva" (Russian version) – 3:01
"Molitva" (Magnetic Club reload mix Serbian version) – 4:26
"Destiny" (Magnetic Club reload mix English version) – 4:23
"Molitva" (Magnetic Club reload mix Russian version) – 4:25
"Molitva" (Jovan Radomir remix) – 3:38
"Rukoilen" (Finnish version) – 3:06
"Molitva" (instrumental) – 3:02

Charts

References

External links 

Marija Šerifović - Molitva (Serbia) 2007 Eurovision Song Contest - Official Eurovision YouTube video.
Lyrics at diggiloo.net

2007 songs
Eurovision songs of Serbia
Eurovision songs of 2007
Eurovision Song Contest winning songs
Songs written by Vladimir Graić